Bills Creek is a stream in Ripley County in the Ozarks of southeast Missouri. It is a tributary of the Current River.

The source area lies just northwest of the junction of Missouri Route 21 and U.S. Route 160 north of the community of Hilltop and northeast of Doniphan. The stream flows west-southwest passing under Missouri Route Y and entering the Current River just east of the Mark Twain National Forest boundary.

Bills Creek has the name of William Richmond, an early settler.

See also
List of rivers of Missouri

References

Rivers of Ripley County, Missouri
Rivers of Missouri